Chester Robert Boak (June 19, 1935 – November 28, 1983) was an American professional baseball player who appeared in ten Major League Baseball games over two seasons — five contests for the  Kansas City Athletics  and five more for the  expansion Washington Senators.

Boak was born in New Castle, Pennsylvania. His pro career lasted for eight total seasons (1955–57; 1960–64).  In 1960, after compiling 96 runs batted in in the Double-A Southern Association and being named all-star second-baseman, Boak was recalled by the Athletics in September. He started four games at second base, and collected two hits (both of them singles) in 13 at bats.  He then was selected by the Senators with the 54th pick in the 1960 Major League Baseball expansion draft, and went hitless in seven at bats for them during the opening weeks of the 1961 season.

He appeared in 891 minor-league games over his career and batted .280 lifetime.

External links

1935 births
1983 deaths
Abilene Blue Sox players
Asheville Tourists players
Baseball players from Pennsylvania
Binghamton Triplets players
Columbia Gems players
Crowley Millers players
Dallas Rangers players
Indianapolis Indians players
Kansas City Athletics players
Major League Baseball second basemen
People from New Castle, Pennsylvania
Portland Beavers players
Salem Rebels players
Shreveport Sports players
Syracuse Chiefs players
Washington Senators (1961–1971) players